Bart Peters (born 2 August 1965) is a Dutch rower. He competed in the men's coxless four event at the 1992 Summer Olympics.

References

External links
 

1965 births
Living people
Dutch male rowers
Olympic rowers of the Netherlands
Rowers at the 1992 Summer Olympics
Rowers from Amsterdam